Ingrid is a feminine given name. It continues the Old Norse name Ingiríðr, which was a short form of  Ingfríðr, composed of the theonym  Ing and the element fríðr "beloved; beautiful" common in Germanic feminine given names. The name Ingrid (more rarely in the variant Ingerid, Ingris or Ingfrid; short forms Inga, Inger, Ingri) remains widely given in all of Scandinavia, with the highest frequency in Norway.
Norwegian usage peaked in the interbellum period, with more than 2% of newly born girls so named in 1920; popularity declined gradually over the 1930s to 1960s, but picked up again in the late 1970s, peaking above 1.5% in the 1990s.

People
Ingerid of Denmark (11th century), Danish princess, Norwegian Queen consort
Saint Ingrid of Skänninge (13th century), Swedish Roman Catholic abbess
Ingrid of Sweden (1910–2000), Swedish princess, Queen Consort of Denmark
Ingrid Alberini (In-Grid, born 1973), Italian singer
Ingrid Alexandra (born 2004), Norwegian princess
Ingrid Andress, American singer-songwriter
Ingrid van Bergen (born 1931), German actress
Ingrid Bergman (1915–1982), Swedish actress
Íngrid Betancourt (born 1961), Colombian politician
Ingrid Bjørnov (born 1963), Norwegian musician
Ingrid Bruce (1940–2012), Swedish civil engineer
Ingrid Bruckert (born 1952), German field hockey player
Ingrid Burley (born 1986), American singer and rapper
Ingrid Burman (born 1952), Swedish politician
Ingrid Caven (born 1938), German actress
Ingrid Chauvin (born 1973), French actress
Ingrid Daubechies (born 1954),  Belgian physicist and mathematician
Ingrid Deltenre (born 1960), Dutch-Swiss manager
Ingrid Engen (born 1998), Norwegian international football player
Ingrid Fliter (born 1973), Argentinian classical pianist 
Ingrid Godon (born 1958), Flemish illustrator
Ingrid del Carmen Montes González (born 1985), Chemistry Professor and Director-at-large at ACS since 2013
Ingrid Guimarães (born 1972), Brazilian actress, comedian
Ingrid Hafner (1936–1994), British actress
Ingrid Hernandez (born 1988), Colombian race walker
Ingrid van Houten-Groeneveld (1921–2015), Dutch astronomer
Ingrid Isotamm (born 1979), Estonian actress
Ingrid Janbell (born 1955), Swedish actress, director and lecturer
Ingrid Jensen (born 1966), Canadian trumpet player and composer
Ingrid Jonker (born 1933), South African poet
Ingrid Kavelaars (born 1971), Canadian actress
Ingrid de Kok (born 1951), South African author
Ingrid Leijendekker (born 1975), Dutch water polo player
Ingrid van Lubek (born 1971), Dutch triathlete
Ingrid Lukas (born 1984), Estonian musician
Ingrid Luterkort (1910–2011), Swedish actress
Ingrid Mattson (born 1963), Canadian activist and scholar
Ingrid Michaelson (born 1979), American singer
Ingrid Moses-Scatliffe (born 1969), British lawyer politician from the British Virgin Islands
Ingrid Nargang (1929–2019), Austrian judge and contemporary historian
Ingrid Newkirk (born 1949), American animal rights activist
Ingrid Nilsen (born 1989), American video blogger
Ingrid Noll (born 1935), German author
Ingrid Oliveira (born 1996), Brazilian competitive diver
Ingrid Park (born 1971), New Zealand television actress
Ingrid Paul (born 1964), Dutch speed skater
Ingrid Pedersen (1933–2012), Swedish aviator
Ingrid Peters (born 1954), German singer
Ingrid Pitt (1937–2010), Polish-British actress
Ingrid Puusta (born 1990), Estonian windsurfer
Ingrid Ragnvaldsdotter (12th century), Queen Consort of Norway
Ingrid Rimland (1936–2017), American psychologist and author
Ingrid Marie Rivera (born 1983), Puerto Rican actress and model
Ingrid Rivera Rocafort, Puerto Rican businesswoman
Ingrid Rodríguez (born 1991), Ecuadorian footballer
Ingrid von Rosen (1930–1995), Swedish diarist, wife of film director Ingmar Bergman
Ingrid Rubio (born 1975), Spanish actress
Ingrid Rüütel (born 1935), Estonian folklorist and philologist, First Lady of Estonia
Ingrid Silva, Brazilian ballet dancer
Ingrid Sischy (1952–2015), South African-born American art and fashion editor
Ingrid Steeger (born 1947), German actress and comedian 
Ingrid Stengård, Finnish mountain bike orienteer
Ingrid Stöckl (born 1969), Austrian alpine skier
Ingrid Thulin (1926–2004), Swedish film actress
Ingrid Tørlen (born 1979), Norwegian beach volleyball player
Ingrid Veninger (born 1968), Canadian actress, writer, director, producer, and film professor
Ingrid Visser (born 1966), New Zealand scientist of Dutch parentage
Ingrid Visser (1977–2013), Dutch volleyball player
Ingrid Gärde Widemar (1912–2009), Swedish lawyer and politician
Ingrid Wildi Merino (born 1963), Chilean-born Swiss video artist
Ingrid Ylva (13th century), Swedish noblewoman

Fictional characters 
Ingrid, from television series Once Upon a Time
Ingrid, from television series Sesame Street
Ingrid, a character from the fighting game series Street Fighter and the video game Capcom Fighting Evolution
Ingrid Beauchamp, from novel Witches of East End and television series Witches of East End
Ingrid Avellan Cortez, from the Spy Kids film trilogy
Ingrid Dracula, from horror drama comedy Young Dracula
Ingrid Fletcher, from television series Porridge and Going Straight
Ingrid Brandl Galatea, from the video game Fire Emblem: Three Houses
Ingrid Giraffe, from the animated television series My Gym Partner's a Monkey
Ingrid Navaro, an antagonist from the Mexican telenovela Abismo de pasión
Ingrid Third, from the animated television series Fillmore!
Ingrid Thorburn, from the black comedy drama Ingrid Goes West

Notes

External links
Nordic Names

Feminine given names
Scandinavian feminine given names
German feminine given names
Dutch feminine given names
Swedish feminine given names
Finnish feminine given names
Danish feminine given names
Icelandic feminine given names
Norwegian feminine given names
Estonian feminine given names
English feminine given names